The Eurasian scops owl (Otus scops), also known as the European scops owl or just scops owl, is a small owl in the typical owl family Strigidae. Its breeding range extends from southern Europe eastwards to southern Siberia and the western Himalayas. It is migratory, wintering in Africa south of the Sahara.

Taxonomy
The Eurasian scops owl was formally described by Swedish naturalist Carl Linnaeus in 1758 in the tenth edition of his Systema Naturae. Linnaeus cited the 1599 description by the Italian naturalist Ulisse Aldrovandi, placed it with all the other owls in the genus Strix and coined the binomial name Strix scops. The Eurasian scops owl is now placed in the genus Otus that was introduced in 1769 by Welsh naturalist Thomas Pennant. The genus name is derived from the Latin  meaning "eared owl". The specific epithet scops is from the Ancient Greek word skōps for a little eared owl. The term is believed to be of Pre-Greek origin; folk etymology links it to σκώπτω (skṓptō, "to mock") or σκέπτομαι (sképtomai, "to examine").

Five subspecies are recognised:
 O. s. scops (Linnaeus, 1758) – France and Italy to the Caucasus area
 O. s. mallorcae von Jordans, 1923 – Iberian Peninsula, Balearic Islands and northwest Africa
 O. s. cycladum (Tschusi, 1904) – southern Greece and Crete to southern Turkey, Syria and Jordan
 O. s. turanicus (Loudon, 1905) – Iraq to northwest Pakistan
 O. s. pulchellus (Pallas, 1771) – Kazakhstan to southern Siberia and western Himalayas

Description 
This is somewhat smaller than the little owl (Athene noctua). It perches upright and shows small ear-tufts. The plumage is predominantly grey-brown in colour, with a paler face, underparts and shoulder line. This species has a strong direct flight on long narrow wings, reflecting its migratory habits.

The call is a deep whistle given by both sexes. It is similar to the call of midwife toads in the genus Alytes.

Distribution and habitat

This bird breeds in southern Europe eastwards into western and central Asia. It is migratory, wintering in southernmost Europe and sub-Saharan Africa. It was spotted in Newtown area near Kolkata for a brief period during October 2021. It was the first sighting in eastern India. It is rare any distance north of its breeding range, usually occurring as a spring overshoot. It is unlikely that this nocturnal owl would be found outside the breeding season when it is not calling.

Behaviour

Breeding
Eurasian scops owls breed in open woodland, parks and gardens. The nest is usually a hole in a tree or in a wall, but can sometimes be an old nest of another species such as a crow. The clutch is usually 4 or 5 eggs. The eggs are incubated only by the female. They hatch after 24-25 days. The young are cared for and fed by both parents. They fledge when aged 21–29 days and become independent of their parents at 30–40 days of age.

Diet
It takes small prey such as insects and other invertebrates. It is largely nocturnal.

References

Sources

External links

Otus (bird)
Birds of Eurasia
Birds described in 1758
Taxa named by Carl Linnaeus